Robert Montgomery Persaud (born 9 May 1974 in Berbice, Guyana) is the Foreign Secretary of Guyana as of 17 August 2020, and a former government minister.

Biography
Persaud graduated Master in Business Administration from the University of West Indies in 2005.

In 1993, he began his career as editor for the Mirror Newspaper. In 1999, he was appointed Presidential Advisor. In 2001, Persaud served in the Cabinet of the Ministry of Natural Resources. From 2006 to 2011, he was served as Minister of Agriculture 

From 2011 until 2015, Persaud served as Minister of Natural Resources and the Environment. 

On 17 August 2020, he was appointed Foreign Secretary.

References

Living people
1974 births
Government ministers of Guyana
Guyanese politicians
Guyanese politicians of Indian descent